Parliamentary elections were held in South Vietnam on 27 September 1963. All but three of the 123 seats in the National Assembly were won by President Ngô Đình Diệm's regime. Three seats were won by the opposition Social Democratic Party and the Dai Viet Progressive Party. As the elections took place during the Buddhist crisis, the government allowed elements of the opposition to stand during the elections as one of the concessions to Buddhist protest leaders. However, due to the 1963 South Vietnamese coup, the National Assembly was not able to convene for its first inaugural session and was forced to dissolve by the military.

Results

References

South Vietnam
Elections in South Vietnam
Parliamentary election
Election and referendum articles with incomplete results